Ulyanovsk, Soviet designation Project 1143.7, was a fixed-wing aircraft carrier laid down on 25 November 1988 as the first of a class of Soviet nuclear-powered supercarriers. It was intended for the first time to offer true blue water naval aviation capability for the Soviet Navy. However, construction of Ulyanovsk was stopped at about 40% after the dissolution of the Soviet Union in 1991.

History

Background 
The Soviet Union's Nevsky Engineering Design Bureau developed the third-generation heavy aircraft cruiser Kuznetsov with Su-33 in the 1980s (plan 1143.5/order 105) and the Varyag aircraft carrier (plan 1143.6/order 106) ), at the same time, in December 1984, the construction of the fourth-generation large-scale nuclear-powered heavy aircraft cruiser began to be constructed. The plan number was "Plan 1143.7", and the preliminary design was completed in 1986. On November 25, 1988, the "Order 107" named "Ulyanovsk" was moved to the shipyard, which was in charge of construction at the Black Sea Shipyard.

To this end, the Soviet government allocated funds to carry out the second large-scale technical transformation of the Black Sea Shipyard, including the construction of an assembly and welding workshop, allowing the hull to be increased in sections to 200 tons; A 350-ton self-propelled flatbed truck was built, and a transport lane from the new workshop to the slipway was built; the length of No. 0 slipway was lengthened by 30 meters; a horizontal slipway-side platform with a total weight of 1,700 tons was built. The slipway and slipway-side platform were installed. Two gantry cranes each with a lifting capacity of 900 tons, and other new cranes were installed, so that the number of cranes used on the entire slipway reached 10; A Liman River channel was completed to ensure that the Ulyanovsk would be able to go to sea in the future.

Ending 
Due to the dissolution of the Soviet Union, Ukraine's funding was insufficient, and the aircraft carrier construction plan was suspended. As of November 1991, Ulyanovsk was only 40% complete.

The No. 2 ship "Plan 1143.8" originally planned to be built was also cancelled at the same time.

Design

Ulyanovsk was based upon the 1975 Project 1153 Orel, which did not get beyond blueprints. The initial commissioned name was to be Kremlin, but was later given the name Ulyanovsk after the Soviet town of Ulyanovsk, which was originally named Simbirsk but later renamed after Vladimir Lenin's original name because he was born there.

It would have been 85,000 tonnes  in displacement (larger than the older  carriers but smaller than contemporary  of the U.S. Navy). Ulyanovsk would have been able to launch the full range of fixed-wing carrier aircraft, as it was equipped with two catapults as well as a ski jump. The configuration would have been very similar to U.S. Navy carriers though with the typical Soviet practice of adding anti-ship missile (ASM) and surface-to-air missile (SAM) launchers. Its hull was laid down in 1988, but construction was cancelled at 40% complete in January 1991 and a planned second unit was never laid down.

In accordance with Decree No. 69-R of February 4, 1992, signed by the First Deputy Prime Minister of Ukraine Kostyantyn Masyk, on February 5, 1992, scrapping of the ship's hull structures began. By October 29, 1992, the slipway was free, and the ship (order 107) had ceased to exist.

Air group

The Ulyanovsk air group was to include 68 aircraft with the following planned composition:

 44 fighter aircraft, combination of Sukhoi Su-33 (Su-27K) and Mikoyan MiG-29K fighters
 6 Yakovlev Yak-44 RLD Airborne early warning aircraft
 16 Kamov Ka-27 Anti-submarine warfare helicopters
 2 Ka-27PS Air-sea rescue helicopters

The ship was equipped with two "Mayak" steam catapults made by the Proletarian factory, a ski-jump, and 4 arresting gear. For storing aircraft, it had a 175×32×7.9-m hangar deck with aircraft elevated to the flight deck by 3 elevators with carrying capacities of 50 tons (two on the starboard side and one on the port). The stern housed the "Luna" optical landing guidance system.

See also
List of ships of the Soviet Navy
List of ships of Russia by project number
Project 23000E

References 
Citations

Bibliography

External links
 Hazegray.org entry.
 Project 1143.7 Orel Ul'yanovsk class, GlobalSecurity.org.
 A Brief Look at Russian Aircraft Carrier Development, Robin J. Lee.

Aircraft carriers of the Soviet Navy
Ships built at the Black Sea Shipyard
Ships built in the Soviet Union
Cancelled aircraft carriers
Abandoned military projects of the Soviet Union